This is a list of roads designated A22. Entries are sorted in the countries' alphabetical order.

 A22 motorway (Austria), a road connecting Vienna and the A23 to Stockerau
 A22 road (England), a road connecting London to Eastbourne, East Sussex
 A22 autoroute, a road connecting Paris to Belgium and the low countries through the Roubaix conurbation
 A22 road (Isle of Man), a road connecting Willaston Corner and Union Mills Road 
 Autostrada A22 (Italy), a highway connecting Modena and Brennero
 A22 motorway (Cyprus), a future road planned to bypass Nicosia
 A22 motorway (Netherlands), a road connecting the interchange Velsenand the interchange Beverwijk
 A22 road (Northern Ireland), a road connecting Dundonald to Comber in County Down, in Northern Ireland
 A22 motorway (Portugal), a road connecting Lagos with Vila Real de Santo António
 Autovía A-22, a road linking the Spanish cities of Huesca and Lleida which is under construction & partially open
 A 22 road (Sri Lanka), a road connecting Passara and Monaragala

See also 
 List of highways numbered 22
 List of 22A roads